The 1994 Louisiana Tech Bulldogs football team was an American football team that represented Louisiana Tech University as a member of the Big West Conference during the 1994 NCAA Division I-A football season. In their seventh year under head coach Joe Raymond Peace, the team compiled an 3–8 record.

Schedule

References

Louisiana Tech Bulldogs
Louisiana Tech Bulldogs football seasons
Louisiana Tech Bulldogs football